Aurá is an extinct language, presumably part of the Tupi language family, last spoken by two individuals in Maranhão, Brazil. Both known speakers originally came from Pará. The language primarily used nouns, with few adjectives or verbs.

References

Tupi–Guarani languages
Languages of Brazil
Extinct languages of South America
Languages extinct in the 2000s